William John Kennedy was a Scottish footballer. His regular position was as an inside forward. He played for Ayr Parkhouse, Newton Heath, Stockport County and Greenock Morton.

References

External links
MUFCInfo.com profile

Year of birth missing
Year of death missing
Place of birth missing
Place of death missing
Scottish footballers
Association football inside forwards
Ayr Parkhouse F.C. players
Manchester United F.C. players
Stockport County F.C. players
Greenock Morton F.C. players